Graphopsocus cruciatus is a species of Psocoptera from Stenopsocidae family. The species was introduced to the West from Asia or Europe in 1930.

Description
The species have five dark marks on the first half of the wing and a light "F" like mark on the second half.

References

External links
Bugguide.net

Stenopsocidae
Insects described in 1768
Psocoptera of Europe
Taxa named by Carl Linnaeus